Laura Hernández Selva (born 13 May 1997) is a Spanish handball player who plays for BM Bera Bera and the Spanish national team.

Club career
Hernández began her career with the handball club CB Elche. In May 2020, she moved to BM Bera Bera, winning the División de Honor title with the club in 2021. She also played in European club competitions, such as the EHF Cup.

International career
Hernández made her first appearance for the Spanish national team on 17 March 2017. She was named to the squad for the 2021 World Women's Handball Championship in Spain.

References

External links

1997 births
Living people
Sportspeople from Elche
Spanish female handball players
Competitors at the 2022 Mediterranean Games
Mediterranean Games gold medalists for Spain
Mediterranean Games medalists in handball
21st-century Spanish women